Richard Gale may refer to:
Richard Gale (British Army officer) (1896–1982), British soldier
Richard Gale (Australian politician) (1834–1931), Member of the Western Australian Legislative Council
Richard Pillsbury Gale (1900–1973), U.S. Representative from Minnesota
Richard Gale (actor), British actor, see List of Secret Army episodes
Rich Gale (born 1954), baseball player